The  is a Japanese local daily newspaper based in Hiroshima. It serves the Chūgoku region of Japan with a market share in Hiroshima, Yamaguchi, Shimane, Okayama and Tottori Prefectures. The newspaper publishes morning and evening editions. The morning paper has a daily circulation of 515,807.

History
The Daily Chugoku was established on May 5, 1892, in Hiroshima and was founded by its editor, Saburo Yamamoto. In 1908, the newspaper changed its name to The Chugoku Shimbun, which translates to "Middle Country Newspaper" (geographically, Hiroshima is near the center of the Japanese archipelago). The A-Bomb on August 6, 1945, killed 113 newspaper employees, and destroyed the building and equipment. The newspaper restarted publishing on August 9 by asking other newspapers for help.

References

Further reading

External links

 

1892 establishments in Japan
Newspapers established in 1892
Japanese-language newspapers
Daily newspapers published in Japan
Mass media in Hiroshima
Companies based in Hiroshima Prefecture